Vladislav Ivanov may refer to:

 Vladislav Ivanov (footballer, born 1986), Russian footballer
 Vladislav Ivanov (footballer, born 1990), football player from Moldova
 Vladislav Ivanov (physicist) (born 1936), Soviet physicist
 Vladislav Ivanov (volleyball) (born 1987), Bulgarian volleyball player